Bazvandi (also Romanized as Bāzvandī; also known as Bāzvand and Bāzvand-e Aşl) is a village in Bazvand Rural District, Central District, Rumeshkhan County, Lorestan Province, Iran. It lies southeast of the village of Rashnudeh. At the 2006 census, its population was 1,213, in 284 families.

References 

Populated places in Rumeshkhan County